Kandadji Sport is a Nigerien football club based in Niamey. The club plays in Niger Premier League.

Stadium
Currently the team plays at the 35000 capacity Stade Général Seyni Kountché.

References

External links

Football clubs in Niger
Sport in Niamey